Élie Halévy (6 September 1870 – 21 August 1937) was a French philosopher and historian who wrote studies of the British utilitarians, the book of essays Era of Tyrannies, and a history of Britain from 1815 to 1914 that influenced British historiography.

Biography
Élie Halévy was born in Étretat, Seine-Maritime, where his mother had fled as the German army marched on Paris. His father was the playwright Ludovic Halévy, his brother was the historian Daniel Halévy. His family was of Jewish descent, but his parents were Protestant and he was brought up as a Protestant. Halévy grew up surrounded by musicians, scholars, and politicians. After studying at the École Normale Supérieure, he received his doctorate in philosophy in 1901 with the theses The Platonic Theory of Knowledge and The Origins of Philosophical Radicalism. The latter formed the base of his first major study, The Formation of English Philosophical Radicalism (3 vols., 1901-1904).

In an article of 1893, Halévy suggested that the great moral question of modern thought was how the abstract idea of duty could become a concrete aim of society. This question had first attracted him to the utilitarians, and he found at the core of their answer a fundamental contradiction. Utilitarianism, he said, was based on two principles: first, that the science of the legislator must bring together the naturally divergent interests of individuals in society; and, second, that social order comes about spontaneously through the harmony of individual interests. To Halévy, this exemplified two fundamental human attitudes toward the universe: the contemplation of the astronomer and the intervention of the engineer.

In 1896, Émile Boutmy invited Halévy to lecture on English political ideas at the newly founded School of Political Science, known today as the Paris Institute of Political Studies (Sciences Po). After 1900, he alternated this course with another, on the history of socialism. At the same time he helped found the Revue de métaphysique et de morale. Halévy remained at Sciences Po until his death in 1937.

Halévy's teaching led him to undertake annual trips to England, during which he became the intimate friend of many of the most important scholars and political figures of the age. He thoroughly explored the Jeremy Bentham manuscripts at Cambridge for his work on philosophical radicalism and over the years developed a deep and intensive knowledge of all the sources of 19th-century English history. In 1901 he began to work on the first volume of his masterpiece, the History of the English People in the Nineteenth Century (published from 1913 onwards). In this first volume, he described England in 1815 and sought to explain how England avoided violent social change. "If economic facts explain the course taken by the human race," he wrote, "the England of the nineteenth century was surely, above all other countries, destined to revolution, both politically and religiously." Neither the British constitution nor the Established Church was strong enough to hold the country together. He found the answer in religious nonconformity: "Methodism was the antidote to Jacobinism."

He did not write his history in chronological sequence, nor did he live to complete it. The second and third volumes of this history (1923) carried the story up to 1841. Then Halévy, profoundly moved by World War I, turned his attention to the period from 1895 to 1914. The two volumes on this period (published in 1926-1930) were written with considerable detachment, considering the immediacy of the problems he discussed. Together with Célestin Bouglé he would republish a set of Saint-Simonian lectures of the 1830, bundled in the 1924 work Doctrine de Saint-Simon.

In lectures of 1929, revised in 1936 (published in 1938; The Era of Tyrannies), Halévy argued that the world war had increased national control over individual activities and opened the way for de facto socialism. In opposition to those who saw socialism as the last step in the French Revolution, he saw it as a new organization of constraint replacing those that the Revolution had destroyed. Wallas translates: 

In what proved to be his last work (which he did not live to complete), Halévy began to bridge the gap between 1841 and 1895 with a volume entitled The Age of Peel and Cobden (1841-1852). A liberal individualist to the last, Halévy died at Sucy-en-Brie on 21 August 1937. His publishers posthumously commissioned R. B. McCallum to contribute a supplementary essay to link this volume with the concluding ones, the whole appearing under the title Victorian Years in 1961.

Publications

In French
Most of these are online free.

 (1896). La Théorie platonicienne des sciences. Paris: Félix Alcan.
 (1901-1904). La Formation du radicalisme philosophique. Paris: Félix Alcan.
 (1901). La Jeunesse de Bentham 1776-1789.
 (1901). L'Évolution de la doctrine utilitaire de 1789 à 1815.
 (1904). Le Radicalisme philosophique.
 (1903). Thomas Hodgskin (1787-1869). Paris: Librairie Georges Bellais. 
 (1913-1946). Histoire du peuple anglais au XIXe siècle.
 (1913). L'Angleterre en 1815.
 (1923). Du lendemain de Waterloo à la veille du Reform Bill.
 (1923). De la Crise du Reform Bill à l'Avènement de Sir Robert Peel: 1830-1841.
 (1946). Le Milieu du siècle: 1841-1852 (posth.)
 (1926). Épilogue 1. Les impérialistes au pouvoir: 1895-1914.
 (1932). Épilogue 2. Vers la démocratie sociale et vers la guerre: 1895-1914.
 (1938). L'Ère des tyrannies, préf. de Célestin Bouglé. (posth.)
 (1948). Histoire du socialisme européen. Paris: Gallimard (posth.)

Works in English translation
Most of these are online free.
 (1928). The Growth of Philosophic Radicalism. New York: The Macmillan Company [London: Faber & Faber, 1952; Clifton, N. J.: Kelley, 1972].
 (1930). The World Crisis of 1914-1918: An Interpretation. Oxford: Clarendon.
 (1932, 1949–52). History of the English People in the Nineteenth Century. Translated by E. I. Watkin. London: Ernest Benn, Ltd. online
 (1949). England in 1815.
 (1949). The Liberal Awakening (1815-1830).
 (1950). The Triumph of Reform (1830-1841).
 (1951). Victorian Years (1841-1895).
 (1951). Imperialism and the Rise of Labour (1895-1905).
 (1952). The Rule of Democracy (1905-1914).
 (1956). Thomas Hodgskin. London: Ernest Benn, Ltd.
 (1965). The Era of Tyrannies. Essays on Socialism and War. Translated by R. K. Webb. Notes by Fritz Stern. New York: Doubleday [London: Allen Lane, 1967].

Selected articles
Halévy, Élie (1921). "Chartism," The Quarterly Review, Vol. 236, No. 468, pp. 62–75.
Halévy, Élie (1922). "Where England Stands at Present," The Living Age, Vol. 314, No. 4078, September 2, pp. 569–574.

See also
 Historiography of the United Kingdom

References

Further reading
 Bone, Christopher (1973). "Elie Halevy: Philosopher as Historian," Journal of British Studies, Vol. 13, No. 1, pp. 151–168.
 Boyd, Kelly, ed. Encyclopedia of historians and historical writing. Vol. 1 (Taylor & Francis, 1999) 508-9.
 Bresciani, Marco. "From 'East to West', the «world crisis» of 1905-1920: a re-reading of Elie Halévy." First World War Studies 9.3 (2018): 275-295.
 Chase, Myrna. Elie Halévy, an Intellectual Biography (Columbia University Press, 1980).
 Frobert, Ludovic (2007). "Elie Halévy's First Lectures on the History of European Socialism," Journal of the History of Ideas, Vol. 68, No. 2, pp. 329–353.
 Jones, Hugh Stuart (2002). "The Era of Tyrannies: Élie Halévy and Friedrich von Hayek on Socialism," European Journal of Political Theory 1, pp. 53–69.
 Smith, Catherine Haugh (1942). "Élie Halévy," in Bernadotte Everly Schmitt, (ed.) Some Historians of Modern Britain: Essays in Historiography. University of Chicago Press.
 Vergara, Francisco (1998). A critique of Élie Halévy:Refutation of an important distortion of British moral philosophy, Philosophy (Journal of the Royal Institute of Philosophy), London, January 1998.

External links
 
 Works by Élie Halévy, at JSTOR
 Élie Halévy, 1870-1937
 Drawing of Élie Halévy, by William Rothenstein

1870 births
1937 deaths
People from Seine-Maritime
Lycée Condorcet alumni
École Normale Supérieure alumni
French essayists
20th-century French historians
20th-century French philosophers
Consequentialists
Utilitarians
French people of Jewish descent
French socialists
French male essayists
French Protestants